A Fortified District refers to the Japanese Army and in certain cases the Japanese Navy defensive fortified organization in World War II. A district was created in order to prevent invasion and provide a base for offensive operation. These fortified districts were built in the area of Manchukuo; Chosen in Korea; Karafuto; Southern Sakhalin and the Kurile Islands - a front of over 6,000 kilometers.

Examples
The Japanese forces had built 17 "fortified districts" and over 4,500 permanent emplacements along the USSR border. Other similar structures were constructed inland in these provinces. In similar form it organized other fortified districts inside mainland Japan (coastal and inner mountainous areas) and overseas provinces (Taiwan, Ryukyu, South Seas Mandate, etc.)

Such installations that were constructed for defensive/offensive purposes were used by both sides. They were designed by the Japanese and used by the Russians during 'August Storm' operations in August 1945, when fire from heavy guns on land and coastal Tochkas was used against Japanese forces.

Examples of heavy Japanese fortified artillery:
 
Type 94 37mm anti-tank (AT) Gun 
Type 1 37mm AT Gun 
Type 1 47mm AT Gun
Type 92 70mm Infantry Gun
Type 98 20mm AA Cannon 
Type 2 20mm AA Cannon 
Type 4 20mm AA Twin Cannon
Type 11 75mm AA Gun 
Type 88 75mm AA Gun 
Type 4 75mm AA Gun 
Type 99 88mm AA Gun 
Type 14 10 cm AA Gun 
Type 3 12 cm AA Gun 
Type 5 15 cm AA Gun (Kugayama Cannon)
28 cm Heavy Howitzer 
Type 38 15 cm Howitzer
Type 45 24 cm Howitzer 
Type 45 15 cm Gun 
Type 7 30 cm Howitzer 
Type 7 10 cm Gun 
Type 7 15 cm Gun 
Type 11 75mm Gun 
Type 89 15 cm Gun 
Type 96 24 cm Howitzer 
Type 96 15 cm Gun 
Experimental 41 cm Howitzer 
Type 90 24 cm Railway Gun (Futtsu Cannon)
and other types of special heavy artillery

Examples remain in:

Chosen Fortifications:
Seishin (now Chongjin) with 4,000 officers and men, protected by heavy coastal artillery, an armored train, a regular train carrying combat equipment, and eight concrete fortifications and emplacements.
Etetin (now Odetsin) 
Genzan (now Wonsan) with 6,238 Japanese officers and soldiers
Rashin (now Najin)
Yuki (called Unggi in Korean, now called Sonbong, or "Vanguard" in North Korea.)
Manchoukouan Fortifications:
Manzhouli 
Kotou 
Fuyuan 
Sungari and the Japanese Army Sungari Flotilla
Xinjing (Changchun) fortified district/defense center
Tuntsiang defense center
Fuqing fortified district with five permanent emplacements, a munitions depot and six mortar batteries. 
Sun’u with 20,000 Japanese officers and soldiers
Sanjiang
Kwantung Fortifications:
Ryojun (now Lüshunkou)
Dalian

See also
Organization of Karafuto Fortress
Organization of Kita and Minami Chisima Fortresses

Military history of Japan during World War II